The 2014 Liège–Bastogne–Liège was the 100th running of Liège–Bastogne–Liège, a single-day cycling race. It was won by Simon Gerrans in a four-rider sprint finish – becoming the first Australian to win the race – ahead of Alejandro Valverde, Michał Kwiatkowski and Giampaolo Caruso.

Teams
As Liège–Bastogne–Liège was a UCI World Tour event, all 18 UCI ProTeams were invited automatically and obligated to send a squad. Seven other squads were given wildcard places, thus completing the 25-team peloton.

The 25 teams that competed in the race were:

Results

References

External links

Liege-Bastogne-Liege
Liege-Bastogne-Liege
Liège–Bastogne–Liège